ACOLOP (acronym for), is an Olympic-related non-profit organization officially established on June 8, 2004, in Lisbon and has been approved by International Olympic Committee. It was founded by the national Olympic committees (NOCs) of Angola, Brazil, Cape Verde, East Timor, Guinea-Bissau, Macau (Chinese SAR), Mozambique, Portugal and São Tomé and Príncipe; it also includes Equatorial Guinea as an associate member. In April 2006, India (represented by the Goa Olympic Association) and Sri Lanka were admitted also as associate members, based on their common historical past with Portugal.

The Portuguese-speaking countries are spread through four continents and reach a total population of about 250 million people. Portuguese thus occupies a place among the most spoken languages in the world. The purpose of reinforcing the bonds between these nations and promoting unity and cooperation through sport was the main reason for ACOLOP's creation.

Goals and projects
The goals which guide this organisation are:

 The spreading of the Olympic ideals on every member country and territory;
 Equality, mutual respect and interest convergence-based cooperation between every member country and territory;
 Cooperation of every member country and territory on the definition of objectives, data exchange and common interests defense;
 Development of Olympic solidarity programs with the International Olympic Committee (IOC) support;
 Cooperation on an Olympic Games mission-chief level;
 Joint-bids for places on the International Olympic Movement structure;
 Staging of the ACOLOP Games (Lusophony Games).

At the 8th general assembly, in Macau (February 2, 2007), the president Manuel Silvério stated the intention of campaigning for the elevation of Portuguese language to official status inside the IOC and Association of National Olympic Committees of Africa (ANOCA) structures. On the agenda is also the creation of a "Lusophone Olympic Academy", institution of an "International Lusophony Day", promotion of an annual football tournament and also an annual sporting awards gala.

On June 8, 2007, precisely three years after the creation of the ACOLOP, the organization's new official portal was launched. Its servers are located on the organization's headquarters in Macau. This portal was established with the purpose of strengthening the communication between the Lusophone world and the ACOLOP. It serves also as a platform to display all news and activities concerning all member associations, especially those that do not have a portal.

Members

Founding members

, China

Associate members

Organization structure
From January 1, 2007, to December 31, 2009, a new board will be led by Manuel Silvério, as a result of elections carried on October 12, 2006. This board's official inauguration took place in Macau, on 4 February 2007, site of the ACOLOP's headquarters. As José Vicente de Moura, is the 2009 Lusophony Games organizing committee president and the vice-president (coming from the Olympic Committee of Portugal) is Manuel Marques da Silva.

See also
 Lusophone Games
 CPLP Games
 Macau 2006 Lusophone Games
 Lisbon 2009 Lusophone Games
 Goa 2014 Lusofonia Games

References

External links

Olympic organizations
Community of Portuguese Language Countries
Lusofonia Games
2004 establishments in Portugal
Organizations established in 2004
Organisations based in Lisbon